End of Innocence is the second official DVD release of Finnish symphonic metal band Nightwish. It features numerous clips of the band performing livetracks, including a recording of the band performing one of their first songs, "Beauty and the Beast", with bassist Marko Hietala performing the male vocal part (in the past this part was performed by Tuomas Holopainen or Tony Kakko, from Sonata Arctica).

However, unlike most music DVDs, the main portion of the disc is dedicated to the End of Innocence documentary (directed by Timo Halo), which involves a long interview with Tuomas Holopainen (keyboards), Jukka Nevalainen (drums) and Tapio Wilska (guest musician and friend of the band, also ex-vocalist of Finntroll), as well as several short clips of the band performing, playing pranks on support bands, recording in the studio and generally having fun.

It also contains a short intro song called "Kiteen Pallo", which can also be found on the Nightwish website.

The limited edition includes a live CD, called Live at Summer Breeze 2002, which contains the tracks "End of All Hope", "Dead to the World", "10th Man Down", "Slaying the Dreamer", "Over the Hills and Far Away", "Sleeping Sun", "The Kinslayer" and "Come Cover Me".

Track listing
1. End of Innocence documentary
1. "How It All Began"
2. "Tavastia Club, Backstage"
3. "Bless the Child"
4. "Tero's Duties"
5. "Caverock"
6. "First Steps"
7. "Heavier Sound"
8. "First Gigs"
9. "Oceanborn"
10. "Sami"
11. "Finnish Midsummer Activities"
12. "First Tour"
13. "The Duties of the Bass Player"
14. "Losing the Innocence"
15. "The Night Owl"
16. "South Korea"
17. "Unnecessary Footage..."
18. "Adventures in Russia"
19. "Wishmaster"
20. "Practical Jokes"
21. "Even More Unnecessary Footage..."
22. "Dead Boy's Poem / Slaying the Dreamer"
23. "South America"
24. "Century Child"
25. "Kitee by Night"
26. "What Makes Tuomas Tick?"
27. "No Balance"
28. "Slain Dreamer"
29. "Keeping the Innocence"
30. "The Innocent & Credits
   
2. Live footage: 4 July 2003 in Norway
1. "Sleeping Sun"
2. "Wild Child"
3. "Beauty and the Beast"
4. "She Is My Sin"
5. "Slaying the Dreamer"

3. Live footage: Summer Breeze Open Air 2002 (5.1 sound)
1. "End of All Hope"
2. "Dead to the World"
3. "10th Man Down"
4. "Slaying the Dreamer"
5. "Over the Hills and Far Away"
6. "Sleeping Sun"

4. Music videos
1. "End of All Hope"
2. "Over the Hills and Far Away"

5. MTV Brasil interview

6. Photo gallery

Sales and certifications

Credits

Band
 Tarja Turunen – lead vocals
 Tuomas Holopainen – keyboards
 Emppu Vuorinen – lead guitars
 Jukka Nevalainen – drums
 Marko Hietala – bass guitar and male vocals
 Sami Vänskä – bass guitar until 2001

Guests
 Tapio Wilska – in the documentary

Crew
 Tero Kinnunen – producer
 Mikko Karmila – mixing
 Timo Halo – director
 Mape Ollila – interview at the cottage

References

External links
 Nightwish's official website
 

Nightwish video albums
2003 video albums
Live video albums
2003 live albums